The Army of the Po (Italian Armata del Po), numbered the Sixth Army (6a Armata), was a field army of the Royal Italian Army (Regio Esercito) during World War II (1939–45).

History 
When it was initially formed on 10 November 1938 under the command of General Ettore Bastico, it comprised three corps: 
the Corpo d'Armata Autotrasportabile (Motor Transportable Corps), consisting of three divisions; 
the Corpo d'Armata Celere (Fast Corps), consisting of three celeri divisions; 
the Corpo d'Armata Corazzato (Armoured Corps), consisting of two motorised and two armoured divisions in the process of formation. These were the Ariete and Centauro armoured divisions and the Trento and Trieste motorised divisions. 
This formation was the brainchild of General Alberto Pariani, then Chief of the General Staff, who desired to combine armoured and motorised divisions into a potent force based in the Po valley and ready to move towards any of Italy's land borders at a moment's notice. By December 1938, Bastico had drawn up plans for concentrating the force around Tarvisio in the event of war with Austria or on a line from Udine to Trieste in the event of war with Yugoslavia.

In 1939, six Blackshirt battalions took part in the field manoeuvres of the Army of the Po. In the first half of 1940 the Centauro division was moved to Albania, where it took part in the Italian invasion of Greece later that year. During the Italian invasion of France (10–25  June 1940), the Army of the Po (minus the Centauro) was held in reserve.

In February 1941, the headquarters of the Army of the Po (Sixth Army) was transferred to southern Italy. On 1 March, the Armoured Corps became the XVII Corps and deployed to Albania as an infantry command. All three of the former corps of the Sixth Army took part in the invasion of Yugoslavia in April. In July 1943, the headquarters of the Sixth Army took charge of the defence of Sicily. The 6th Army suffered heavy losses against the Allies in July–August 1943 and withdrew to northern Italy for reorganization. It capitulated to the Germans upon the surrender of Italy in September 1943.

Order of battle on 10 June 1940
 Army of the Po (Sixth Army), General Mario Vercellino
 Fast Corps, General Giovanni Messe
 1st Cavalry Division "Eugenio di Savoia", General Federico Ferrari Orsi
 2nd Cavalry Division "Emanuele Filiberto Testa di Ferro", General Gavino Pizzolato
 3rd Cavalry Division "Principe Amedeo Duca d'Aosta", General Mario Marazzani
 Armoured Corps, General Fidenzio Dall'Ora
 101st Motorised Division "Trieste", General Vito Ferroni
 102nd Motorised Division "Trento", General Luigi Nuvoloni
 132nd Armoured Division "Ariete", General Ettore Baldassarre
 133rd Armoured Division "Littorio", General Luigi Manzi
 Motor Transportable Corps: General Francesco Zingales
 9th Infantry Division "Pasubio", General Vittorio Giovannelli
 10th Infantry Division "Piave", General Ercole Roncaglia
 52nd Infantry Division "Torino", General Luigi Manzi

Order of battle on 9 July 1943 (Sicily) 
 Sixth Army, General Alfredo Guzzoni
 XII Army Corps, General Mario Arisio, from 12 July: General Francesco Zingales 
26th Infantry Division "Assietta"
28th Infantry Division "Aosta"
202nd Coastal Division
207th Coastal Division
208th Coastal Division
230th Coastal Division
XXIX Coastal Brigade
 XVI Army Corps, General Carlo Rossi 
4th Infantry Division "Livorno"
54th Infantry Division "Napoli"
206th Coastal Division
213th Coastal Division
 XVIII Coastal Brigade
 XIX Coastal Brigade

Commanders
 Ettore Bastico (October 1938 – June 1940) 
 Mario Vercellino (June 1940 – November 1940) 
 Francesco Zingales (interim) (November 1940 – February 1941) 
 Ezio Rosi (February 1941 – February 1943) 
 Mario Roatta (February 1943 – June 1943) 
 Alfredo Guzzoni (June 1943 – September 1943)

Notes

References

Sources

 
 

Field armies of Italy in World War II